The David Crockett Fire Hall and Pumper, at 205 Lafayette St. in Gretna, Louisiana, was listed on the National Register of Historic Places in 1983.  The fire station was built in 1859. It is a two-story wood-frame structure, which was later modified.

The firehouse is part of Gretna Historical Society Museum. It is also a contributing property of the Gretna Historic District.

References

Fire stations on the National Register of Historic Places in Louisiana
National Register of Historic Places in Jefferson Parish, Louisiana
Government buildings completed in 1859
Historical societies in Louisiana
1859 establishments in Louisiana
Fire stations completed in the 19th century
Individually listed contributing properties to historic districts on the National Register in Louisiana